Aníbal Gaviria Correa (born 16 January 1966) is a Colombian politician who has served as the Governor of Antioquia since 2020. Prior to this, Gaviria was the Mayor of Medellín from 2012 to 2015 and served as a visiting scholar at University of California, Berkeley. He previously served as Governor of Antioquia from 2004 to 2007.

Biography

Education
Gaviria studied business administration at EAFIT University, and he later studied at Harvard Extension School.

Political career
During his career in the public administration is to be highlighted his term as Governor of Antioquia between 2004 and 2007, where he directed the management efforts to unified the work with other actors in the state towards the pursuit of higher levels of equity and development for the citizens of Antioquia.

In 2007 the “Proyecto Líder Colombia” recognized him as the best Governor of Colombia. As a leader his management reached 89% favorability. In 2009 he was a presidential candidate of the Liberal Party and then vice presidential running mate of his party in the 2010 elections.

He was elected as mayor of the city of Medellin for the period 2012–2015. He was previously the governor of Antioquia Department from 2004 to 2007. He is a member of the Liberal Party.

References

|-

|-

|-

|-

1966 births
Mayors of Medellín
Colombian people of Basque descent
Living people
Colombian Liberal Party politicians
Harvard Extension School alumni